Stefan G. Rasmussen (born 23 July 1947) is a former Danish 
pilot who captained the crash-landing SAS flight 751 on 27 December 1991. There were no fatalities in the crash, and Rasmussen received much recognition for his handling of the incident. He entered politics, and served in the Danish Folketing parliament from 1994 to 1996.

Biography
He was born in Randers, and trained as a pilot in the Royal Danish Air Force (1970–1994) and graduated from Williams Air Force Base, Arizona in 1973 (class 74-01).

On 27 December 1991, he was the Captain of Scandinavian Airlines Flight 751, a McDonnell-Douglas MD-81 registered OY-KHO which crash-landed at Gottröra in Sweden. In the initial climb both engines ingested ice which had built up on the two wings, which had not been properly deiced before departure, the engines then surged. Both engines were destroyed, leaving the aircraft with no propulsion. After a controlled low-altitude glide, the aircraft landed in a field and broke into three parts. No fire broke out and all aboard the plane survived.

Rasmussen was decorated by Queen Margrethe II of Denmark for his outstanding and professional performance. He received several recognitions, such as: IFALPA Polaris Award, IAPA Outstanding Service Award, Aviation Week & Space Technology Laurels Award and Hall of Fame recognition and H. M. The King's Medal from King Carl XVI Gustaf of Sweden.

Rasmussen was a member of the Danish Folketing Parliament for the Conservative People's Party from 1994 to 1996, but had to terminate his membership due to a severe Tinnitus he had had after the emergency landing with the SAS plane. In the period 2000 and up to 2005, Rasmussen was a member of the city council in Frederikssund. He has published the book "Det gælder dit liv!" and has for many years been an active speaker in both Denmark and abroad. In 2021 he published the book "Du ska' ikk' spare mig..."" on the same occasion the book "Det gælder dit liv!" republished in a new edition

Rasmussen was diagnosed with PTSD as a result of the aftermath of the accident and retired in 1992 after 13 years of flying with Scandinavian Airlines.

In 2005, Rasmussen actively resumed music as his main occupation, and he has since released a number of songs in the genre Lounge Jazz: In 2011, "All of Me… A'live!" (UPC 5710261010209), in 2012, "Lazy Times…" (UPC 5710261030931), in 2017, "Fly Us to the Moon ..." (UPC 7071245394073), in 2018, "Let Me Sing for Evermore ...", (UPC 7071245603205), in 2021, "Just for You, Vol. 1", (UPC 196006665821), and "Just for You, Vol. 2", (UPC 196006664282)

References

External links
Profile interview by Berlingske Tidende

1947 births
Living people
Danish aviators
Survivors of aviation accidents or incidents
People from Randers
Members of the Folketing
Knights of the Order of the Dannebrog
Conservative People's Party (Denmark) politicians